Anhoni is a 1973 Pakistani film directed by Iqbal Akhtar, starring Waheed Murad, Aliya Begum and Lehri. It was premiered on 21 December 1973. Lal Mohammad Iqbal composed the music in the voices of Ahmed Rushdi and Runa Laila.

Cast
  Aliya Begum
  Waheed Murad
  Lehri
  Zarqa
  Seema
  Zahid Khan
  Rashid
  Saajan
  Mehboob Kashmiri
  Hamid
  Jalil Afghani

Songs
Hai Kahan Woh Kali (Ahmed Rushdi)
Mein Tujhey Nazar Kya Doon (Ahmed Rushdi)

Box office
Anhoni was a silver jubilee hit, completing 31 weeks in theaters.

References

External links
 

1973 films
1970s Urdu-language films
Pakistani romance films
Films scored by Lal Mohammad Iqbal
Urdu-language Pakistani films